Jinlong station may refer to the following stations in China:

 Jinlong station (Guangzhou Metro), a station on Line 7 of Guangzhou Metro in Foshan, Guangdong.
 Jinlong station (Shenzhen Metro), a station on Line 14 of Shenzhen Metro in Shenzhen, Guangdong.